Figgy duff is a traditional bag pudding from the province of Newfoundland and Labrador most commonly served as a part of a Jiggs dinner. It is sometimes called a raisin duff. The word 'Figgy' (or figgie) is an old Cornish term for raisin; perhaps indicating the origin of the settlers who brought this dish to the area.  It is very similar to the Scottish Clootie Dumpling.

One traditional recipe lists the ingredients as breadcrumbs, raisins, brown sugar, molasses, butter, flour, and spices. These are mixed and put in a pudding bag, wrapped in cheesecloth, or stuffed into an empty can and then boiled, usually along with the cooking vegetables of the Jiggs dinner.

See also 
 Poutchine au sac, Métis bag pudding from Western Canada
 Clootie dumpling, very similar Scottish Traditional Pudding
 Spotted dick, similar British raisin pudding
 Figgy pudding

External links
 Recipe for Figgy Duff
 Newfoundland Figgy Duff Recipe - Food.com
 Newfoundland Figgy Duff. A generations old tradition.

Cuisine of Newfoundland and Labrador
Puddings